Giuseppina Pastori (12 October 1891 – 1983) was an Italian physician and biologist.

Life 
Pastori was born in Milan, Italy to a family of eight children. She attended public schools in Milan until the age of eight, and the family encouraged the children to study a trade following this mandatory schooling. Pastori declared her intention to study medicine, which was summarily forbidden by her mother. Pastori was tutored in mathematics, physics, and chemistry, among other subjects by her sister Maria (who would later go on to become a mathematics professor), prior to attending the University of Milan and the University of Pavia. She earned her medical doctorate in 1921.

After her doctorate she took a job at the University of Milan, where she started research into histology. In addition to her role at the university Pastori took on a volunteer role at the hospital in Milan, and later a paid role at a nursing home. She was later granted a scholarship from the Italian Medical Women's Association, which afforded her access to the histology laboratory at the University of Rome. In 1930 Pastori became a lecturer of histology and professor of biology at the Università Cattolica del Sacro Cuore. This role required permission from the Vatican, however initially it was refused. After Pastori referred to the precedent of Maria Gaetana Agnesi, the Vatican gave permission for Pastori to take on the roles.

Notes

References

1891 births
University of Milan alumni
University of Pavia alumni
1983 deaths
Italian biologists
Italian women scientists
20th-century biologists